Naved Ahmed may refer to:

 Naved Ahmed (cricketer, born 1971), Pakistani cricketer for Islamabad
 Naved Ahmed (cricketer, born 1978), Pakistani cricketer for Lahore Whites
 Naved Ahmed (1970s cricketer), Pakistani cricketer for Punjab and Sargodha
 Naved Ahmed (cricketer, born 1986), Indian cricketer for Bengal